Giorgio Gorla (born 7 August 1944 in Novara) is an Italian sailor. He is a 3-time Olympian, winning two bronze medals.

External links

1944 births
Italian male sailors (sport)
Living people
Olympic medalists in sailing
Sailors at the 1980 Summer Olympics – Star
Sailors at the 1984 Summer Olympics – Star
Sailors at the 1988 Summer Olympics – Star
Star class world champions
Medalists at the 1984 Summer Olympics
Medalists at the 1980 Summer Olympics
Olympic bronze medalists for Italy
World champions in sailing for Italy
20th-century Italian people
21st-century Italian people